The 2003–04 season of the Venezuelan Primera División, the top category of Venezuelan football, was played by 10 teams. The national champions were Caracas.

Torneo Apertura

Torneo Clausura

Promotion/relegation playoff

External links
Venezuela 2003-04 season at RSSSF

Venezuelan Primera División seasons
Ven
Ven
2003–04 in Venezuelan football